One of Mine is an album by organist Jimmy McGriff recorded and released by Sue Records in 1963.

Reception 

The Allmusic review by Michael Erlewine stated "His second album, again on Sue. ... ten hi-energy cuts".

Track listing 
All compositions by Jimmy McGriff except where noted
 "Gospel Time" – 5:30
 "Gospel Time Encore" – 3:07
 "Spindletop" – 4:07
 "Teach Me Tonight" (Gene De Paul, Sammy Cahn) – 5:53	
 "The Last Minute" – 4:18
 "Moonlight in Vermont" (Karl Suessdorf, John Blackburn) – 3:47	
 "Blip Time" – 3:20
 "One of Mine" – 4:36
 "Drown in My Own Tears" (Henry Glover) – 3:55
 "Broadway" (Billy Bird, Teddy McRae, Henri Woode) – 5:42

Personnel 
Jimmy McGriff – organ
Morris Dow – guitar, harmonica
Larry Frazier – rhythm guitar
 Willie "Saint" Jenkins – drums

References 

1963 albums
Jimmy McGriff albums
Sue Records albums